The Best American Short Stories 2018, a volume in the Best American Short Stories series, was edited by Heidi Pitlor and by guest editor Roxane Gay.

Short Stories included

References

Fiction anthologies
Short Stories 2018
2018 anthologies
Houghton Mifflin books